The Minolta X-570 (X-500 in Europe) was introduced in 1983 as a lower cost alternative to the X-700. It used the same chassis as the rest of the Minolta X series and the standard  Minolta SR mount. The primary difference between the top-of-the-line X-700 and the X-570 is that the latter lacked the fully automatic Program exposure mode. However, the X-570 added an important feature that would be part of all subsequent X series cameras, but never added to the X-700, a match LED exposure meter. This system indicated the selected shutter speed with a blinking LED and the suggested shutter speed, based on the exposure value and the selected lens aperture, with a solid LED.  Some consider the X-500 more of an enthusiast's camera than the X-700, since it offered no P mode and therefore required some photographic knowledge.

References

135 film cameras
X-570
Cameras introduced in 1983